The 1991–92 Western Kentucky Hilltoppers men's basketball team represented Western Kentucky University during the 1991–92 NCAA Division I men's basketball season. The Hilltoppers were led by coach Ralph Willard and All-Sun Belt Conference player Jack Jennings.  The team received a bid to the 1992 National Invitation Tournament.

Schedule

|-
!colspan=6| Regular Season

|-

 

|-
!colspan=6| 1992 Sun Belt Conference men's basketball tournament

|-
!colspan=6| 1992 National Invitation Tournament

References

Western Kentucky
Western Kentucky Hilltoppers basketball seasons
Western Kentucky
Western Kentucky Basketball, Men's
Western Kentucky Basketball, Men's